Begur may refer to:

 Begur, Bangalore, Karnataka, India
 Begur, Dharwad, Karnataka, India
 Begur, Gundlupet, Karnataka, India
 Begur, Catalonia, Spain